Krysten Boogaard (born 18 February 1988) is a Canadian basketball center who played for the University of Kansas Jayhawks. Her older brother, the late Derek Boogaard, played in the NHL for the Minnesota Wild and New York Rangers, while her other brother, Aaron Boogaard, played in the Pittsburgh Penguins organization.

Playing career

Kansas Jayhawks

2008-09
Third on the team in scoring (9.0) and second in rebounding (5.5)
Finished the season as the KU leader in field goal percentage at .530 (116-of-219)
Finished the season with 31 blocks, which ranked second on the team and 11th in the Big 12 Conference
 Finished the season with three-straight double-figure performances, marking the first time in her KU career she went over 10 points in three-consecutive games
Led KU on its west coast swing with 20 points and seven boards at UCLA (Dec. 21, 2008) and followed that up with a 22-point, nine-rebound effort at Pepperdine (Dec. 23, 2008)
Had 18 points and 13 rebounds at Nebraska (Jan. 21, 2009), marking her first double-double of the season
Also had a double-double in the Jayhawks' win over #5 Baylor (March 4, 2009) with 18 points and 11 rebounds

2007-08
Third on the team in both scoring (9.4) and rebounding (5.6) on the season
Led KU in blocks with 36 in her first season as a Jayhawk
 Led KU in scoring on six occasions and in rebounding 10 times
Was the first KU player to score in a game on 10 occasions
Named to the Big 12 All-Freshman Team by the Waco Tribune-Herald and the Dallas Morning News, as well as earning a spot on the Big 12 All-Rookie team as voted by the league coaches
Surpassed the 20-point mark in scoring on four occasions, including a career-high 24 points versus San Jose State (Dec. 19, 2007) 
Pulled down a career-best 14 rebounds at Kansas State (Feb. 9, 2008) in the Sunflower Showdown

Team Canada
Boogaard was one of 12 Canadians chosen as part of the inaugural class at Canada Basketball's National Elite Development Academy in Hamilton, Ontario in 2006
She averaged 14 points, 10 rebounds and four blocks at the National Elite Development Academy where she was coached by Christine Stapleton
She led the Canadian Junior National Team to the silver medal last summer at the FIBA Americas Under-18 Championships in Colorado Springs, Colo

High school
 Named MVP, Best Defensive Player and Athlete of the Year during her career at Archbishop M.C. O'Neill High School prior to attending the National Elite Development Academy
Was a Regina League All-Star participant and also earned letters in badminton, water polo and volleyball at Archbishop M.C. O'Neill.

Kansas  statistics

Source

Awards and honors
•2007-08 Big 12 All-Rookie Team
•2007-08 Waco Tribune-Herald Big 12 All-Freshman Team
•2007-08 Dallas Morning News Big 12 All-Freshman Team
•2007-08 Most Improved
Earned Phillips 66 Big 12 Rookie of the Week honors for the week of Jan. 28-Feb. 4, 2008 after averaging 15.5 points, 10.0 rebounds and 3.5 blocks in games versus Oklahoma and Iowa State

References

1988 births
Living people
Basketball people from Saskatchewan
Canadian expatriate basketball people in the United States
Canadian women's basketball players
Centers (basketball)
Kansas Jayhawks women's basketball players
Sportspeople from Regina, Saskatchewan